Keith Smith (19 November 1952 – 2 June 2006) was an English dual-code international rugby union, and professional rugby league footballer who played in the 1970s.

Background
Keith Smith was born in Leeds, West Riding of Yorkshire, England, he became a postman, and coached junior rugby league at East Leeds A.R.L.F.C., he was diagnosed with cancer, he died aged 53 in St. Gemma's Hospice, Leeds, West Yorkshire, and his funeral took place at Lawnswood Crematorium, Leeds at 9.40am on Friday 9 June 2006.

Playing career
Keith Smith first played rugby union with Moortown RUFC, and Yorkshire Colts rugby then advanced to Roundhay. It was from that side that he was selected to play for England.

His Roundhay début was against local rivals West Leeds Old Boys in 1972. The last of his eventual 85 games was played was against Gosforth in 1976 for the National Cup. He eventually played 14 times for Yorkshire.

http://www.pitchero.com/clubs/westleedsrufc/teams/71605

His first English appearance was a disappointing 12-12 draw against France played at Parc des Princes in Paris on 2 March 1974. In this game his centre pairing was Coventry’s Geoff Evans. Peter Squires and Alan Old also played alongside him, they were both from his Yorkshire club. The following day over 200 people, many rugby supporters returning from the match, were killed in an air crash over Northern France.

Smith then went on the play for England against Wales at Twickenham two weeks later and added two more caps against Wales in Cardiff in 1975 and then playing against Scotland at Twickenham the following game.

Smith’s trademark skill was an irresistible dummy and a beautiful pair of hands, while his ability to glide through the tightest defences made him a valuable centre, and he transferred those skills from rugby union to rugby league when he joined Wakefield Trinity .

Challenge Cup Final appearances
Keith Smith played right-, i.e. number 3, in Wakefield Trinity’s 3-12 defeat by Widnes in the 1979 Challenge Cup Final during the 1978–79 season at Wembley Stadium, London on Saturday 5 May 1979, in front of a crowd of a crowd of 94,218. and he played left-, i.e. number 4, and scored a try in England’s 15-7 victory over Wales in the 1979 European Rugby League Championship match during the 1978–79 season at Lowerhouse Lane, Widnes on Saturday 16 March 1979.

References

External links
(archived by web.archive.org) Former England centre Keith Smith dies at rfu.com
Wakefield Today
Keith Smith - Rugby player won fame in both codes
Dual code star Smith dies

1952 births
2006 deaths
Deaths from cancer in England
Dual-code rugby internationals
England international rugby union players
England national rugby league team players
English rugby league players
English rugby union players
Rugby league centres
Rugby league players from Leeds
Rugby union centres
Rugby union players from Leeds
Wakefield Trinity players
Yorkshire County RFU players